Totteridge may refer to:

Totteridge in the London Borough of Barnet, Greater London, England
The Totteridge Academy, a school in Barnet
Totteridge Millhillians, a cricket club from Totteridge in the Hertfordshire Cricket League
Totteridge, Buckinghamshire, an area of High Wycombe, England
Arnold Totteridge, recurring character on BBC radio comedy I'm Sorry, I'll Read That Again

See also
The Totteridge XI, a painting of 11 show dogs